Vineta Muižniece (born 3 November 1956) is a Latvian jurist and politician. In 2004, she was justice minister. She was a Deputy Speaker of the Saeima from 2005 until 2009, being a member of the People's Party. Since 2010, she is a justice of the Constitutional Court. In 2011, she was suspended due to criminal proceedings against her for alleged forging of documents while working in the parliament.

References

External links
Personal data on CC website

1956 births
Living people
Politicians from Riga
People's Party (Latvia) politicians
Ministers of Justice of Latvia
Deputies of the 7th Saeima
Deputies of the 8th Saeima
Deputies of the 9th Saeima
Judges of the Constitutional Court of Latvia
Constitutional court women judges
Latvian women judges
Women deputies of the Saeima
Women government ministers of Latvia
Female justice ministers
21st-century Latvian women politicians
21st-century Latvian judges
21st-century women judges